Ángel Villacampa Carrasco (born 14 December 1976) is a Spanish football manager who is the manager Club América in the Liga MX Femenil since June 2022.

Between 2017 and 2019, Villacampa worked as a coach at the Atlético Madrid. In 2018, he was named the head coach of the China U-17 women's national team.

Career 
Villacampa was put in charge of the Atlético Madrid ahead of the 2017–18 season.

In 2018, Villacampa became the manager for the China U-17 women's national team.

In 2019, Villacampa was named the head coach of Athletic Club. 

In 2021, Villacampa was named the head coach of Levante.

In 2022, Villacampa was appointed as manager of Club América in the Liga MX Femenil.

Honours

Manager
Atlético Madrid
Primera División: 2018

References

External links
 

1976 births
Living people
Spanish football managers
Club América (women) managers